Poronia is a genus of fungi in the family Xylariaceae. The genus was circumscribed by Karl Ludwig Willdenow in 1787.

Species
Poronia australiensis
Poronia ehrenbergii
Poronia erici
Poronia gigantea
Poronia gleditschii
Poronia oedipus
Poronia pileiformis
Poronia punctata

References

Xylariales